Escape From New York The Official Story of the Film is a book by John Walsh published December 14, 2021. This is a behind the scenes look at the making of the film Escape From New York from 1981. Walsh had previously written Harryhausen: The Lost Movies and Flash Gordon: The Official Story of the Film.

Overview
The book's publication was announced in April 2021. It was published in December and featured new interviews with cast and crew.

Forbidden Planet TV’s Andrew Sumner, Josh Weiss at Syfy Wire and Variety interviewed Walsh about the book.

AIPT Comics review of the book summarised it as “a  behind-the-scenes book worthy of Brain’s vast library" and a "unique glimpse into the inner workings of a Carpenter classic".

In 2022 the book was nominated as Book for the Year by the Rondo Hatton Classic Horror Awards

Publication
Published in December 2021 by Titan Books.

References

External links
 Official website
Official YouTube

2021 non-fiction books
Books about film
Books about film directors
Coffee table books
History of film
Snake Plissken Chronicles
Titan Books titles